The SEAT Inca (Typ 9K) was a van and panel van produced by the Spanish manufacturer SEAT between 1996 and 2004. It was designed and assembled in Spain, based on the SEAT Ibiza Mark 2. It was first shown at the Barcelona Motor Show of 1995.

Design
The SEAT Inca had two rear wing doors which, because they were non symmetrical, were supposed to facilitate loading and unloading. The Inca was awarded the Comercial do Ano ("Commercial vehicle of the Year") award in Portugal in 1997.

Performance
The Inca came with 1.4  and 1.6  petrol engines, and was also available with the tried and tested  1.9-liter (1896cc) indirect injection diesel engine from the Volkswagen Golf and Volkswagen Polo, or a  Turbocharged Direct Injection (TDI) diesel in certain countries.

A  1.9-liter Suction Diesel Injection (SDI) direct injection diesel with electronic control and improved economy over the indirect injection engine was also available from 1999 onwards.

Sales
From its launch in 1997 until end of production in 2004, more than 115,000 SEAT Inca cars were produced and sold. The annual production of SEAT Inca delivery/panel van (without side windows) and Kombi (with side windows and removable seats that could be used for cargo or passengers) manufactured at SEAT Martorell are shown below. SEAT facilities only; corrected 7/11/2018 from cited Volkswagen and SEAT annual reports of 1997 :

Rebadges

The SEAT Inca was rebadged by SEAT's parent company Volkswagen and sold under the name Volkswagen Caddy (Typ 9K). Its badge-engineered Volkswagen stablemate was identical in every respect apart from some (easily interchangeable) branding logos, and the front grille.

In the beginning of the 2000s, the Volkswagen Group had decided to shift the marketing focus of the SEAT brand to target the younger driver with an emphasis on more sporty models. Despite this move, the Caddy and the Inca continued to be produced at the same manufacturing facilities, until the Inca was discontinued in June 2004.

The Inca name was then dropped from the line up of SEAT, but the Caddy was replaced with a new variant based on the platform of the Volkswagen Golf V.

References

External links

SEAT corporate website

Inca
Vehicles introduced in 1995
Cars of Spain